Hesperaptyxis luteopictus is a species of sea snail, a marine gastropod mollusk in the family Fasciolariidae, the spindle snails, the tulip snails and their allies.

References

External links
 Snyder M.A. & Vermeij G.J. (2016). Hesperaptyxis, a new genus for some western American Fasciolariidae (Gastropoda), with the description of a new species. The Nautilus. 130(3): 122-126

luteopictus
Gastropods described in 1887